The Blackfin hookear sculpin (Artediellichthys nigripinnis) is a species of marine ray-finned fish belonging to the family Cottidae, the typical sculpins. It is the only species in the monospecific genus Artediellichthys. This species is found in the northern Pacific Ocean.

The blackfin hookear sculpin was first formally described as Artediellus nigripinnis in 1937 by the Soviet zoologist Peter Schmidt with its type locality given as between St. Jona Island and the western coast of the Kamchatka Peninsula in the Sea of Okhotsk. In 1973 Vladimir Vladimirovich Fedorov reclassified the species in the monospecific genus Artediellichthys. he 5th edition of Fishes of the World classifies this genus in the subfamily Cottinae of the family Cottidae but other authorities classify it in the subfamily Psychrolutinae of the family Psychrolutidae.

References

Cottinae

Fish described in 1937